Avicenna Research Institute (ARI) – affiliated to ACECR – was established in Tehran in order to achieve the latest medical technologies through conducting clinical and laboratory research projects in 1998. The institute consists of three research centers, including the Reproductive Biotechnology Research Center (RBRC), the Monoclonal Antibody Research Center (MARC), and the Nanobiotechnology Research Center (NBRC). ARI also includes the Avicenna Biotechnology Incubator and the Avicenna Infertility Clinic (AIC).

Named after Ibn Sina, the research institute was founded in 1998 at Shahid Beheshti University in Tehran.

The Reproductive Biotechnology Research Center (RBRC) includes Embryology and Andrology, Reproductive Genetics and Biotechnology, Reproductive Immunology, Reproductive Infections, and Bio Law & Ethics departments.
For the purpose of laying the groundwork to provide therapeutic services and applied research findings in the field of infertility treatment, the Avicenna Infertility Clinic (AIC) was founded. Five specialized clinics, including Infertility Treatment, Recurrent Abortion, Perinatology, Sexual Health, and Replacement Therapies make up the AIC.

The Monoclonal Antibody Research Center (MARC), established in 2001, consists of Hybridoma, Immunochemistry, and Antibody-Antigen Engineering Departments.

Following the introduction of nanotechnology and nanobiotechnology as one of the main priorities of the Iranian nation, the Nanobiotechnology Research Center (NBRC) was founded in 2005. Three departments, including Nanotechnology, Recombinant Technology, and Medical Diagnostic Products form the NBRC.

Interaction between specialists of various professional fields, such as biology, biotechnology, and clinical and molecular medicine in eleven research departments provides the basis for educational and scientific activities.

Using modern equipment and enjoying a specialized team at the Avicenna Research Institute, the Medical Biotechnology Incubator initiated its activities with technical, economic, and scientific support of ARI, in 2010.

The main activities of this center are summarized in the fields of reproductive biotechnology, monoclonal antibodies, nanobiotechnology, etc. All the established sections in this center have the possibility to benefit from the facilities and services provided by the Reproductive Biotechnology Research Center, Monoclonal Antibody Research Center, Nanobiotechnology Research Center, and the Avicenna Infertility Clinic.
The Medical Biotechnology Incubator is intended to foster new professions and encourage entrepreneurs working within the newly founded units in the above fields.

The most prominent missions of the ARI are as follows:
 Conducting basic, applied, and therapeutic research projects in the fields of reproduction and cancer treatment
 Identifying and fulfilling requirements related to biotechnologies in diagnostic and therapeutic areas
 Attracting M.Sc and Ph.D students to conduct research
 Arranging postgraduate courses on modern technologies in collaboration with different universities
 Giving information, publishing books and journals, as well as holding national, regional, and international conferences

External links
 Avicenna Research Institute
 Avicenna Infertility Clinic
 Avicenna Journal of Medical Biotechnology
 Journal of Reproduction and Infertility

Medical research institutes in Iran
Avicenna